Jimmy De Wulf (born 9 June 1980) is a Belgian professional football coach and a former player who is an assistant coach with Cercle Brugge. De Wulf played as a central defender.

Career

Club career
De Wulf's career took off when Belgian top teams Club Brugge and Standard Liège discovered him at the age of 12, playing for his local team SV Blankenberge. Given the fact that Liège was lying much further away from Blankenberge than Bruges, De Wulf chose to join Club. During his youth, De Wulf has been selected many times to play for the national team.

When De Wulf reached the age of 18, he was offered a contract for 5-year. Despite the promising prospects, De Wulf did not play much for Club Brugge under the coaching of Trond Sollied, and he was loaned for six months to Tromsø IL. At the end of his loan, Tromsø wanted to buy De Wulf, but Club halted his transfer. De Wulf, tired of not playing for the first team, decided to put pressure on the management. Eventually, De Wulf was loaned for one season to Cercle Brugge, thanks to the good relations between the chairmen of both teams. When the season ended, De Wulf was definitively transferred to Cercle for a fair price.

A minority of Cercle Brugge fans responded negatively to this transfer. The point of discussion was that De Wulf probably was a fan of Club Brugge, considering his choice to play for the rivals of Cercle Brugge in his youth. These rumours faded out thanks to De Wulf's great team spirit on the pitch. De Wulf used to be vice-captain of the team, but in July 2007, the new Cercle Brugge manager Glen De Boeck named De Wulf as captain instead of Denis Viane.

However, due to Denis Viane and Anthony Portier proving to be Cercle's solid back bone in the 2007-08 season, De Wulf's chances to play were rather limited. At the end of the season, the Cercle board told De Wulf they would not start doing difficult if he found himself a new team. SV Roeselare, KV Kortrijk, Tromsø IL and FC Brussels are said to be interested. Eventually, De Wulf was loaned by KV Oostende for one season.

His contract with Cercle ended in June 2009 and was not renewed.

References

External links
 
 

1980 births
Living people
Belgian footballers
Cercle Brugge K.S.V. players
Club Brugge KV players
Tromsø IL players
K.V. Oostende players
Enosis Neon Paralimni FC players
Belgian Pro League players
Challenger Pro League players
Eliteserien players
Cypriot First Division players
Belgian expatriate footballers
Expatriate footballers in Norway
Belgian expatriate sportspeople in Norway
Expatriate footballers in Cyprus
Belgian expatriate sportspeople in Cyprus
Association football defenders
People from Blankenberge
Footballers from West Flanders
Belgian football managers
Cercle Brugge K.S.V. managers